The Japanese Regional Champions League (Zenkoku Chiiki Sakkā Championzu Rīgu), known before 2016 as Japan Regional Football League Competition, is a nationwide play-off tournament meant as a transition for Japanese football clubs competing in regional leagues to the Japan Football League.

History

Until 1976, the main entrance route for regional clubs to the Japan Soccer League was the All Japan Senior Football Championship, a cup competition. In 1977, to test clubs in a league environment before entrance to the league, the Japan Football Association devised this tournament.

In 1984 and 1985 more promotion places were added due to the JSL, expanding its divisions. In 1992 it began promoting clubs to the former JFL's second division and, from 1994 to 1998, to its single division. In 1999 and 2000 it added extra promotion places due to the formation and expansion of the new JFL.

Yamaha Motors (Júbilo Iwata) are, thus far, the only Regional Series champions to later become First Division champions. They are also the only club to retain the title, as they failed to be promoted in their first attempt due to losing a playoff series. Since 1980 every champion has been automatically promoted, exceptions being made at the champion's request in 1993 (Nippon Denso/FC Kariya) and 2002 (Ain Foods) as they lacked the resources to compete at the national level.

Qualification
Until 2009, the number of places in the tournament was 16, distributed as follows:
All regional league champions (9 clubs)
4 regional league runners-up (4 clubs)
University club recommended by the university association (1 club)
Club recommended by the JFA (1 club)
All Japan Senior Cup winner (1 club)
Other clubs (other league runners-up, Senior Cup runners-up or third places, etc.) (0-3 clubs) – more allowed if Senior Cup holder has won a regional league or been runner-up

As of 2010, the regional league runners-up are no longer eligible and the university association is no longer allowed to make recommendations, reducing the number of places to 12.
All regional league champions (9 clubs)
Club recommended by the JFA (at most 1 club)
All Japan Senior Cup winners and runners-up (at most 2 clubs)
 This may be replaced by third and/or fourth-placed team if the winners and/or runners-up win a regional league or recommended by the JFA.
Regional league runners-up (0-3 clubs)
 This number of clubs changes by the result of "Club recommended by the JFA" and "All Japan Senior Cup".

Format

Preliminary round
The clubs are grouped in round-robin groups of four, playing at a single city per group (no home-and-away format is followed). Only three matches are played per club, since the match location is the same. The winners of each group qualify for the final round.

Final round
As of 2010, the three group winners plus the highest-scoring runner-up are grouped in a final group in a single locale, with three matches played per club. The top two places are guaranteed promotion and the third place may play a promotion/relegation series against one of the three bottom JFL clubs (subject to JFL place availability).

Round-robin rules
The usual 3-1-0 system is used; however, in case of a draw, a penalty shootout is added and the winner gets one extra point.

Winners
Teams in bold were promoted.

Source: JFA

Wins by region
Clubs in bold compete in the J.League (any division) in the 2023 season. Clubs in italics no longer exist. A dagger (†) indicates clubs that moved away from the region after winning the title.

See also

 Sport in Japan
 Football in Japan
 Women's football in Japan
 Japan Football Association (JFA)

 Soccer/Football
 League system
 Japanese association football league system
 J.League
 J1 League (Tier 1)
 J2 League (Tier 2)
 J3 League (Tier 3)
 Japan Football League (JFL) (Tier 4)
 Regional Champions League (Promotion playoffs to JFL)
 Regional Leagues (Tier 5/6)

 Domestic cup
 Fuji Xerox Super Cup (Super Cup)
 Emperor's Cup (National Cup)
 J.League YBC Levain Cup (League Cup)

 Futsal
 F.League
 F1 League (Tier 1)
 F2 League (Tier 2)
 JFA Futsal Championship (National Cup)
 F.League Ocean Cup (League Cup)

 Beach soccer
 Beach Soccer Championship (National Cup)

References
 Contents of Domestic Competition of Football in Japan

External links
JFA official page
Japanese Regional Leagues summary(SOCCERWAY)
 2011 season at the JFA
 Unofficial site from JFL News 

Pro
1977 establishments in Japan
Recurring sporting events established in 1977